Hu Yepin (4 May 1903 – 7 February 1931) was a Chinese writer, poet, and playwright. Hu was a member of the League of Left-Wing Writers and was executed in February 1931 by the Kuomintang government along with other writers such as Li Weisen.

Hu was the first husband of the celebrated writer Ding Ling, who was also a member of the Left League, and a close friend of the writer Shen Congwen.

Life and career

He was born Hu Peiji on 4 May 1903 in Fuzhou, Fujian province. He had four younger brothers and a younger sister. At age 15 he began working as an apprentice of a goldsmith.

In 1920 Hu moved to Shanghai, where he attended Pudong High School, and changed his name to Hu Chongxuan. A year later he went to Tianjin to study at the Dagukou navy academy. However, the navy academy was shut down soon afterwards, and he drifted to nearby Beijing. He changed his name again to Hu Yepin.

In the summer of 1924, Hu met Ding Ling, who had recently arrived in Beijing from Shanghai. They fell in love and became unofficially married in 1925.

At the end of 1928, Hu, Ding, and their close friend, writer Shen Congwen, left Beijing for Shanghai. The trio founded the Red and Black Publishing House and its journal Red and Black. The venture was unsuccessful, and closed soon afterwards. To repay his debts, Hu accepted a teaching job at the provincial high school in Jinan, the capital of Shandong province, in 1929. According to linguist Ji Xianlin, who was a student at the high school, the arrival of Hu Yepin and his fashionable wife Ding Ling from Shanghai caused a sensation at the school.

In May 1930, the Kuomintang government ordered the arrest of Hu for his pro-Communist teaching. Hu and Ding were forced to leave Jinan and returned to Shanghai, where they joined the League of Left-Wing Writers, which had just been established two months before. Hu served as an executive committee member of the league.

In November 1930, Hu joined the Communist Party of China. In the same month, Ding Ling gave birth to a boy named Hu Xiaopin, who was later renamed Jiang Zulin after Hu Yepin's death, using Ding Ling's real surname Jiang.

Arrest and execution
In September 1930, the Kuomintang leader Chen Lifu formally banned the Left League. Orders were also issued to arrest its members. The League was driven underground.

On 17 January 1931, while attending a secret Communist Party meeting at the Oriental Hotel in the Shanghai International Settlement, Hu was arrested along with other attendees by the British police.

When Hu failed to return home, Ding Ling and Shen Congwen searched frantically for him. A day later, Shen received confirmation that Hu had been arrested by the British police and extradited to the Kuomintang, and was imprisoned in Longhua, suburban Shanghai, where many Communists were held. Shen and Ding sought help from prominent intellectuals including Hu Shih, Xu Zhimo, Cai Yuanpei, and Shao Lizi, who lobbied Chen Lifu and the Shanghai mayor Zhang Qun for Hu's release, all to no avail.

On 7 February 1931, the Kuomintang executed 23 Communists in Longhua, including three women, one pregnant. Hu Yepin was one of the five members of the Left League executed on that day, along with Rou Shi, Li Weisen, Yin Fu, and Feng Keng. Together they are remembered as the Five Martyrs of the League of Left-Wing Writers by the Communist Party of China.

The circumstances of Hu's arrest along with other communists had been controversial. However, most publications in China and Taiwan now agree that they were betrayed by members of a rival Communist faction, possibly Wang Ming and his close associates, Gu Shunzhang and Tang Yu.

Works
Hu Yepin's early writings, such as Where to Go, were semi-autobiographical, reflecting his sense of despair over the widespread poverty and hopelessness that were prevalent in China during the 1920s. A Pearl in the Brain was one of his most highly regarded works. Hu was one of the few among the May Fourth writers who wrote in the then-new vernacular Chinese language with ease.

In all of Hu's novels, the poor always lose. His reaction against social injustice made him susceptible to the influence of the Communist ideology. In 1930, the year he joined the Communist Party, and shortly before his execution, he published the novella To Moscow and the novel A Bright Future.

References

Bibliography

1903 births
1931 deaths
Writers from Fuzhou
People executed by the Republic of China
Executed writers
Executed people from Fujian
Republic of China novelists
Republic of China poets
20th-century executions by China
Poets from Fujian
20th-century novelists
20th-century poets